Fabienne Dufour (born 11 July 1981 in Bastogne) is a retired female butterfly and freestyle swimmer from Belgium, who competed for her native country at the 2000 Olympic Games in Sydney, Australia.

Dufour is best known for winning the silver medal in the women's 4×100 m medley relay event at the 2000 European LC Championships in Helsinki, Finland, alongside Sofie Wolfs (backstroke), Brigitte Becue (breaststroke), and Nina van Koeckhoven (freestyle).

References
 

1981 births
Living people
People from Bastogne
Belgian female butterfly swimmers
Belgian female freestyle swimmers
Swimmers at the 2000 Summer Olympics
Olympic swimmers of Belgium
European Aquatics Championships medalists in swimming
Sportspeople from Luxembourg (Belgium)